Matthew Cocks may refer to:

Matthew Cocks, musician in Josef K (band)
Matthew Cocks, footballer for Żurrieq F.C.

See also
Matthew Cox (disambiguation)